Drug-induced pruritus is itchiness of the skin caused by medication, a pruritic reaction that is generalized.

See also 
 Pruritus
 List of cutaneous conditions

References

External links 

Pruritic skin conditions
Drug-induced diseases